Melolontha is a genus of beetles in the family Scarabaeidae. The European cockchafers belong to this genus.

Taxonomy

Linnaeus called the European cockchafer Scarabaeus melolontha. Étienne Louis Geoffroy used Melolontha as a genus name (1762), but his book has been suppressed by the International Commission of Zoological Nomenclature, and the authority for the name is the later (1775) publication by Johan Christian Fabricius.

Species 

The following is a list of species within the genus Melolontha:
Melolontha aceris Faldermann, 1835
Melolontha afflicta Ballion, 1870
Melolontha albida Frivaldszky, 1835
Melolontha anita Reitter, 1902
Melolontha argus Burmeister 1855
Melolontha bifurcata (Brenske, 1896)
Melolontha chinensis (Guerin, 1838)
Melolontha ciliciensis Petrovitz
Melolontha flabellata Sharp, 1876
Melolontha frater Arrow, 1913 – Indonesia
Melolontha fuscotestacea Kraatz, 1887
Melolontha guttigera Sharp, 1876
Melolontha hippocastani Fabricius, 1801 – European forest cockchafer
Melolontha incana Motschulsky, 1853
Melolontha insulana Burmeister, 1939
Melolontha japonica Burmeister, 1855
Melolontha kraatzi Reitter 1906
Melolontha melolontha (Linnaeus, 1758) – common European cockchafer
Melolontha papposa Illiger, 1803
Melolontha pectoralis Megerle von Mühlfeld, 1812 – European large cockchafer
Melolontha rubiginosa
Melolontha rufocrassa Fairmaire, 1889
Melolontha satsumaenis Niijima & Kinoshita
Melolontha virescens (Brenske, 1896)

References

Scarabaeidae genera
Taxa named by Johan Christian Fabricius
Melolonthinae